Xia Xiaowan (born 1959 in Beijing, China) is a painter.

Biography
In 1982, Xia graduated from the Third Studio of Oil Painting Department of the Central Academy of Fine Arts. The following year, he became Art Editor for China Machinery Publishing, leaving in 1984.

Xia currently lives in Beijing, working as a professor in the stagecraft department of the Central Academy of Drama. He is also a member of the China Oil Painting Institute, Beijing Artists Association and Beijing Arts of Oil Painting Commission.

Exhibitions
 2012 "Xia Xiaowan Solo Exhibition", Museum of Contemporary Arts, MoCA, Singapore
 2006 "Hyper Design – the 6th Shanghai Biennale", Shanghai Art Museum, Shanghai, China
 2006 "2006 New York Asia Art Fair", New York, USA
 2006 "The 2nd Biennale of Austria 2006", Klagenfurt, Austria
 2006 "Mahjong – Chinesische Gegenwartskunst aus der Sammlung Sigg", Hamburger Kunsthalle, Hamburg, Germany
 2005 "Mahjong – Chinesische Gegenwartskunst aus der Sammlung Sigg", Kunstmuseum
 2005 Bern, Bern, Switzerland
 2005 "Yellow River – A Review of New Chinese Oil Painting", National Museum of China, Beijing, China
 2005 "Hand in Hand with the New Century – The Third Exhibition of Chinese Oil Painting", National Museum of China, Beijing, China
 2005 "2005 – Pingyao International Photography Art Exhibition", Pingyao, China
 2004 "Posers – Group Exhibition of Courtyard Gallery Artists, Courtyard Gallery, Beijing China
 2004 "2004 Asia contemporary Art Exhibition", Gwangju, Korea
 2004 Art of Xiaxiaowan, Time Gallery, Qingdao, China (solo)
 2003 "How do you see with your mind & body? Xia Xiaowan's works on paper", Today Art Gallery, Beijing, China (solo)
 2003 "The International Sketch Art", China, England, Australia
 2002 "Vigor of the Century – Contemporary Art of Chinese 50 Artists", China Millennium Monument, Beijing, China

 2001 "Anxiety: the drawn figure", The University of New South Wales College of Fine Arts, New South Wales, Australia
 2001 Chengdu Biennale, Chengdu, China
 2000 "20th Century Chinese Oil Painting Exhibition", National Museum of Art, Beijing, China
 1998 The MEDIAWAVE FESTIVAL, Hungary.
 1998 "Looking Up", SCHOENI Gallery, Hong Kong, China (solo)
 1996 The Repetition of Beginning, China
 1996 Chinese Oil Painting Annual Exhibition, Beijing Museum of Art, China
 1996 "Group Exhibition in Düsseldorf", Düsseldorf, Germany
 1995 The April Exhibition, the Gallery of the Central Academy of Fine Arts, China
 1994 "The Annual Exhibition of Works of the artists Nominated by Art Critics", Beijing Museum of Art, Beijing, China.
 1991 "'91 March Exhibition", the Central Academy of Fine Arts, Beijing, China.
 1991 "Chinese New Art Post 1989", Hong Kong Arts Center, Hong Kong. Marlborough Gallery, England and Australia
 1989 "Modern Art from China", Beijing Museum of Art, Beijing, China
 1988 "An exhibition of modern Chinese Art", National Museum of China, Beijing, China
 1987 "Towards the Future", Beijing Museum of Art, China
 1985 "The November Exhibition", the Palace Museum, Beijing, China

External links
 Gallery of 3-D Works
 Portrait of Xia Xiao Wan
 Christie's auction item
 Xia Xiaowan, la tridimensionalidad del arte

References

Painters from Beijing
1959 births
Living people
Central Academy of Fine Arts alumni
Academic staff of the Central Academy of Drama